

	

Seddon is a locality in the Australian state of South Australia located on Kangaroo Island about  south-west of the state capital of Adelaide and about  south-west of the municipal seat of Kingscote. 

Its boundaries were created in March 2002 for the “long established name” which was derived from the cadastral unit of the Hundred of Seddon in which it is located.

Seddon is bounded by the Playford Highway and the town of  Parndana  to the north and by the South Coast Road in part to the south.   The principal land use in the locality is primary production with exception to land reserved for conservation purposes as the Seddon Conservation Park and land adjoining the town of Parndana which is zoned for residential and commercial purposes.

Seddon is located within the federal division of Mayo, the state electoral district of Mawson and the local government area of the Kangaroo Island Council.

See also
Seddon (disambiguation)

References
Notes

Citations

Towns on Kangaroo Island